This list of Karelians lists both people from Republic of Karelia, Finnish Karelians and other people of Karelian ancestry.

People from Republic of Karelia

Viena Karelians
 Arhippa Perttunen, rune singer
 , rune singer

Finnish Karelians
 Antti Aalto, Finnish ice hockey player
 Matti Aarnio, Finnish military officer and motti specialist
 Aleksanteri Aava, Finnish poet
 Tuomas Aho, Finnish football player
 Aleksanteri Ahola-Valo, Finnish artist, architect and thinker
 Martti Ahtisaari, Finnish president from 1994 to 2000, Nobel Peace Prize Laureate 2008
 Toimi Alatalo, Finnish cross country skier and Olympic winner
 Koop Arponen, Finnish-Dutch musician
 Alfred Asikainen, Finnish wrestler, Olympic bronze medallist and participant in longest wrestling match in history
 Teuvo Aura, Finnish politician, born in Ruskeala
 Anna Easteden, Finnish actress
 , Finnish basketball player. Mother of Lauri Markkanen and Eero Markkanen
 , Finnish bandy player
 Kari Haakana, Finnish ice hockey player
 Veikko Hakulinen, Finnish cross country skier and three time Olympic winner
 Arto Halonen, Finnish filmmaker
 Kaarlo Halttunen, Finnish actor
 Ann-Elise Hannikainen, Finnish composer
 , Finnish composer and violinist
 Heikki Hannikainen, Finnish diplomat
 Ilmari Hannikainen, Finnish composer and pianist
 Pietari Hannikainen, Finnish writer
 P.J. Hannikainen, Finnish composer
 Tauno Hannikainen, Finnish conductor and cellist
 , Finnish composer
 Toomas Heikkinen, Finnish rallycross driver
 Kari Heiskanen, Finnish actor
 Katri Helena, Finnish singer
 Mikko Hietanen, Finnish long-distance runner, European Champion
 Laila Hirvisaari, Finnish author
 Tuomas Holopainen, Finnish musician
 Hannu Hoskonen, Finnish politician
 Veikko Huhtanen, Finnish gymnast and three time Olympic winner
 Jouni Hynynen, Finnish musician
 Mikko Hyyrynen, Finnish football player
 Juho Hänninen, Finnish rally driver
 Jorma Härkönen, Finnish middle-distance runner
 Simo Häyhä, Finnish sniper
 Ansa Ikonen, Finnish actress
 Rieti Itkonen, Finnish politician
 Max Jakobson, Finnish-Jewish diplomat
 Mikko Jokela, Finnish ice hockey player
 Jesse Joronen, Finnish football player
 Aarne Juutilainen, Finnish Army captain and mercenary in French Foreign Legion
 Ilmari Juutilainen, Finnish fighter ace
 Nestori Kaasalainen, Finnish politician
 Marjatta Kajosmaa, Finnish cross-country skier, four time Olympic medallist
 Hannu Kapanen, Finnish ice hockey player
 , Finnish rune singer
 Paavo Karjalainen, Finnish journalist and politician
 Aki Karvonen, Finnish cross-country skier and three time Olympic medallist
 Veikko Karvonen, Finnish marathon runner and Olympic bronze medallist
 Heino Kaski, Finnish composer
 Pia Kauma, Finnish politician
 Yrjö Keinonen, Finnish general and former Chief of Defence
 Matti Kekki, Finnish politician
 Anneli Kiljunen, Finnish politician
 Anssi Kippo, Finnish music producer
 Marja-Liisa Kirvesniemi, Finnish cross-country skier, three time Olympic gold medallist and four time bronze medallist
 Eila Kivikk'aho, Finnish poet
 Timo Kivinen, Finnish general and Chief of Defence
 Uuno Klami, Finnish composer
 Teuvo Kohonen, Finnish researcher, best known for the development of self-organizing map
 Yrjö Kokko, Finnish writer
 Janne Kolehmainen, Finnish ice hockey player
 Joonas Kolkka, Finnish football player
 Gustaf Komppa, Finnish chemist
 Aku Korhonen, Finnish actor and director
 Paavo Korhonen, Finnish skier
 Väinö Korhonen, Finnish modern pentathlete, two time Olympic bronze medallist
 Tapio Korjus, Finnish javelin thrower
 Esko Kovero, Finnish actor
 Mateli Magdalena Kuivalatar, Rune singer
 Sakari Kukko, Finnish musician
 Mikko Kuningas, Finnish football player
 Jarno Kultanen, Finnish ice hockey player
 Jari Kurri, Finnish ice hockey player
 Kyösti Kylälä, Finnish engineer and inventor
 Heikki Kähkönen, Finnish wrestler and Olympic medallist in Greco-Roman wrestling.
 Kyösti Laasonen, Finnish archer, Olympic bronze medallist
 Samppa Lajunen, Finnish Nordic combined athlete, three time Olympic gold medallist
 Timo Lavikainen, Finnish actor
 Eino Leino, Finnish poet
 Ville Leino, Finnish ice hockey player
 , Finnish businessman and politician
 Kari Liimo, Finnish basketball player
 Arvi Lind, Finnish news anchor
 Antti Lindtman, Finnish politician
 Anna-Liisa Linkola, Finnish politician
 Kaarlo Linkola, Finnish botanist and phytogeographer
 , Finnish rune singer
 Antti Litja, Finnish actor
 Jari Litmanen, Finnish football player
 Olavi Litmanen, Finnish football player
 Eino Luukkanen, Finnish fighter ace
 Matti Lähde, Finnish cross country skier and Olympic winner
 Pave Maijanen, Finnish musician
 Niina Malm, Finnish politician
 Albin Manner, Finnish politician
 Martti Mansikka, Finnish gymnast, Olympic bronze medallist
 Jussi Markkanen, Finnish ice hockey player
 Marjo Matikainen, Finnish cross-country skier and politician, Olympic gold medallist and three time World Champion. Chairwoman of Karjalan Liitto 2011-2017
 Pentti Matikainen, Finnish hockey coach and general manager. Led Finland to silver medals in the 1988 Winter Olympics and the 1992 World Championships, and to third place in the 1991 Canada Cup
 Erkki Melartin, Finnish composer
 Veijo Meri, Finnish writer
 Hannu Mikkola, Finnish rally driver
 Lauri Mononen, Finnish ice hockey player
 Matti Mononen, Finnish pole vaulter
 Veikko Muronen, Finnish engineer
 Antti Muurinen, Finnish football coach
 Jonni Myyrä, Finnish javelin thrower, two time Olympic winner
 Jani Mäkelä, Finnish politician
 Jarmo Mäkinen, Finnish actor
 Anders Nevalainen, Finnish gold- and silversmith, and a Fabergé workmaster
 Yrjö Nikkanen, Finnish javelin thrower, Olympic silver medallist
 Lauri Nissinen, Finnish fighter ace
 Petteri Nokelainen, Finnish ice hockey player
 Sulo Nurmela, Finnish cross-country skier and Olympic winner
 Voldemar Oinonen, Finnish General
 Onni Okkonen, Finnish art historian
 Jukka Paarma, Finnish Archbishop
 Erkki Paavolainen, Finnish journalist and politician
 Jaakko Paavolainen, Finnish historian
 Olavi Paavolainen, Finnish writer
 Pekka Paavolainen, Finnish lawyer and politician
 Aaro Pajari, Finnish Major General
 Ari Pakarinen, Finnish javelin thrower
 Esa Pakarinen, Finnish actor
 Hanna Pakarinen, Finnish singer
 Iiro Pakarinen, Finnish ice hockey player
 Pia Pakarinen, Finnish actress
 Juho Paksujalka, Finnish politician
 Larin Paraske, Izhorian-Karelian rune singer
 Aki Parviainen, Finnish javelin thrower
 Urho Peltonen, Finnish javelin thrower, two time Olympic medallist
 Eino Penttilä, Finnish javelin thrower
 Arhippa Perttunen, Rune singer
 Kauko Pirinen, Finnish historian
 Antti Puhakka, Finnish poet
 Olli Puhakka, Finnish fighter ace
 Ari Puheloinen, Finnish general and former Chief of Defence
 Teemu Pukki, Finnish football player
 Anna Puu, Finnish singer
 Markku Pölönen, Finnish director
 Jussi Pylkkänen, Finnish art dealer
 , Finnish soldier and farmer
 Jaska Raatikainen, Finnish musician, former drummer and co-founder of the band Children of Bodom
 Väinö Raitio, Finnish composer
 Siiri Rantanen, Finnish cross country skier and Olympic winner
 Armi Ratia, Finnish entrepreneur, co-founder of Marimekko
 Oskari Reinikainen, Finnish physician and politician
 Lauri Kristian Relander, Finnish president from 1925 to 1931
 Ilkka Remes, Finnish writer
 Juuso Riikola, Finnish ice hockey player
 Jorma Rissanen, Finnish information theorist, and originator of the minimum description length principle
 Santtu-Matias Rouvali, Finnish conductor
 Kimi Räikkönen, Finnish F1 World Champion
 Arto Räty, Finnish general
 Seppo Räty, Finnish javelin thrower
 Matti Rönkä, Finnish writer
 Kaija Saariaho, Finnish composer
 Sylvi Saimo, Finnish politician and Olympic winner
 Sipe Santapukki, Finnish drummer
 Aulis Sallinen, Finnish composer
 Petri Sarvamaa, Finnish politician
 , Finnish rune singer
 Aarne Sihvo, Finnish general and former Chief of Defence
 Hannu Siitonen, Finnish javelin thrower. European champion and Olympic silver medallist
 Mikko Silvennoinen, Finnish television host, journalist and producer
 Anton Suurkonka, Finnish farmer, business executive, lay preacher and politician
 Juhani Suutarinen, Finnish biathlete
 Sten Suvio, Finnish boxer and Olympic winner
 Taiska, Finnish singer
 Jaakko Tallus, Finnish Nordic combined athlete and Olympic gold medallist
 Martti Talvela, Finnish operatic bass
 Penna Tervo, Finnish politician
 Einari Teräsvirta, Finnish gymnast, Olympic winner and architect
 Juha Tiainen, Finnish hammer thrower and Olympic winner
 Kimmo Tiilikainen, Finnish politician
 Reino Tolvanen, Finnish actor
 Ari Torniainen, Finnish politician
 Heikki Turunen, Finnish writer
 Tarja Turunen, Finnish singer-songwriter
 Aale Tynni, Finnish poet
 Lauri Törni, born in Viipuri, Törni was a soldier and winner of the Mannerheim Cross during the Continuation War, who later served with the German and American armies. Later known as Larry Thorne
 Riitta Uosukainen, Finnish politician, Counselor of State
 Urho Vaakanainen, Finnish ice hockey player
 , Finnish scientist, CEO of Solar Foods
 Alisa Vainio, Finnish long-distance runner
 Jukka Vakkila, Finnish football manager
 Jorma Valkama, Finnish athlete, Olympic bronze medallist in long jump
 Väinö Valve, Finnish general
 Tatu Vanhanen, Finnish political scientist and author
 Matti Vanhanen, Finnish politician
 Ari Vatanen, Finnish politician and former rally driver
 Vesa Vierikko, Finnish actor
 Vesa Viitakoski, Finnish ice hockey player¨
 Lauri Vilkko, Finnish pentathlete and Olympic medallist
 Johannes Virolainen, Finnish politician, Counselor of State
 Emppu Vuorinen, Finnish musician
 Vilho Väisälä, Finnish meteorologist, physicist and founder of Vaisala
 Yrjö Väisälä, Finnish astronomer and physicist
 Martti Välimaa, Finnish American football defensive tackle
 Stephen Wäkevä, Finnish silversmith and a Fabergé workmaster

Other ethnic Karelians
 Nikolay Abramov, Vepsian writer
 Boris Akbulatov, artist
 Pamela Anderson, Canadian-American actress and model
 Aleksandr Hudilainen, Ingrian politician
 Reino Häyhänen, Ingrian lieutenant colonel of Soviet Russia, spy, and defector to the United States
 Robert Ivanov, Russian-Ingrian football player
 Kristina Karjalainen, Karelian-Lithuanian model born in Estonia
 Aleksandr Kokko, Ingrian football player
 Leo Komarov, Finno-Russian ice hockey player in the National Hockey League
 Yelena Kondulainen, Ingrian actress
 Timothy Kopra, astronaut
 Robert Kurvitz, Estonian-Karelian novelist, musician, and video game developer
 Valeri Minkenen, Ingrian football player
 Matti Poikala, Swedish wrestler
 Roland Pöntinen, Ingrian-Swedish pianist and composer
 Igor Novozhilov, Russian-Karelian physicist and mathematician
 Elmo Nüganen, Estonian-Ingrian actor and director
 Hillar Rootare, Estonian-Ingrian physical chemist
 Jarmo Sandelin, Swedish golfer
 Vasili Vainonen, Ingrian choreographer
 Alina Voronkova, Russian-Ingrian model

Karelians
People from Karelia